The 1990–91 National Hurling League was the 60th season of the National Hurling League, the top league for inter-county hurling teams, since its establishment in 1925. The season began on 14 October 1990 and concluded on 12 May 1991.

Kilkenny came into the season as defending champions of the 1989-90 season. Clare and Waterford entered Division 1 as the two promoted teams.

On 12 May 1991, Offaly won the title after a 2-6 to 0-10 win over Wexford. It was their first league title ever.

Dublin were the first team to be relegated after losing all of their group stage games, while Clare suffered the same fate.

Division 1

Table

Group stage

Knock-out stage

Quarter-finals

Semi-finals

Final

Top scorers

Top scorers overall

Top scorers in a single game

Division 2

Table

Play-off

References

National Hurling League seasons
1990 in hurling
1991 in hurling